Grenland is a traditional district in the county of Vestfold og Telemark, in the south-east of Norway. Located in the southeastern part of the county, Grenland is composed of the municipalities Skien, Porsgrunn, Bamble, and Siljan. Sometimes the municipalities Kragerø and Drangedal of the smaller Vestmar region are also considered to be part of the area. The region encompasses 1,794 km2 and has 122,978 inhabitants (2004), which translates as 12% of the area and 64% of the population of Telemark.

Grenland is the core of a slightly larger traditional district known as Nedre Telemark ("Lower Telemark") which also includes Bø, Sauherad and Heddal.

Grenland, Grænafylket and Vestmar
In the early Viking Age, before Harald Fairhair, Grenland, was a petty kingdom. Originally Grenland was probably the name of the region surrounding the lake Norsjø in Nedre Telemark, however, not identical with Grænafylket which also included the coastal villages. Grænafylket (or Grenafylket) contained the coastal region Vestmar and the landscapes further inland.

Vestmar is assumed to signify the land to the west of the sea (mar), however sea in this case should be interpreted as fjord, i.e. Langesundsfjorden. Vestmar was described as a county already in the 8th century AD.

The name Grenland is derived from a people, the Grener, i.e. "the land of the Grener". It is mentioned as a Gothic nation by Jordanes in his work Getica from about 551 AD: "Sunt quamquam et horum positura Granii, Agadii, Eunixi, Thelae, Rugi, Harothi, Ranii." (Getica, III:24)

Metropolitan Grenland
Grenland is also the name of an agglomeration consisting of the cities Skien and Porsgrunn.

During the period of the municipality mergers in Norway, the chief administrative officer (fylkesmann) in Telemark proposed that the municipalities Skien, Solum, Gjerpen, Porsgrunn, Eidanger and Brevik be merged to form a large urban municipality centered on Skien. The municipalities had been closely integrated since the establishment of the Hydro factory at Herøya, and conurbation between the settlements was also significant.

However, the idea was opposed by Solum as well as Porsgrunn, Eidanger and Brevik and soon fell out of grace. Eidanger proposed a merger with Brevik and Porsgrunn, and the enlarged Porsgrunn municipality was finally created on 1 January 1964. Brevik lost its city status in the process. In light of this merger, the central authorities saw only one possible solution; a similar merger between Solum, Gjerpen and Skien. Unlike the first proposal, this was met by protests from Gjerpen - to no avail, as the case went to the Norwegian Parliament. The result was a significantly enlarged Skien municipality. On 1 January 1968 an area from the old Gjerpen and Solum municipalities with 3,554 inhabitants was moved to Porsgrunn.

In addition, the urban municipalities Langesund and Stathelle was incorporated into the rural municipality Bamble. Like Brevik, both Langesund and Stathelle lost their city status. Siljan municipality remained unaffected by the mergers, contrary to the initial expectations.

Today Brevik, Stathelle and Langesund have all regained their city status.

References

Notes

Districts of Vestfold og Telemark
Metropolitan regions of Norway
Petty kingdoms of Norway